Ronna C. Burger (born December 5, 1947) is an American philosopher and Professor of Philosophy, Catherine & Henry J. Gaisman Chair, and Sizeler Professor of Jewish Studies at Tulane University.

Career
She received her PhD in Philosophy from the New School for Social Research Graduate Faculty and has been teaching at Tulane since 1980. Her research has been supported by the Andrew W. Mellon Foundation, the National Endowment for the Humanities, Earhart Foundation, Alexander von Humboldt Foundation and Carl Friedrich von Siemens Foundation. She is the author of books and articles on Plato and Aristotle, and her graduate seminars on those thinkers have often led to dissertations in ancient philosophy.  In recent years she has extended her studies to Maimonides and the Hebrew Bible, writing essays, teaching courses, and lecturing on numerous college campuses.

Books
 On Plato's Euthyphro (Carl Friedrich von Siemens Foundation, 2015)
 Aristotle's Dialogue with Socrates: on the Nicomachean Ethics (Chicago, 2008)
 The Phaedo: A Platonic Labyrinth (Yale, 1984. Reprinted, St. Augustine's Press 1999)
 Plato's Phaedrus: A Defense of a Philosophic Art of Writing (Alabama, 1980)
 The Eccentric Core: the Thought of Seth Benardete co-edited with Patrick Goodin (St. Augustine's Press, 2017)
 The Archaeology of the Soul: Platonic Readings in Ancient Poetry and Philosophy by Seth Benardete, co-edited with Michael Davis (St. Augustine's Press, 2012)
 Encounters and Reflections: Conversations with Seth Benardete (ed.) (Chicago, 2002)
 The Argument of the Action: Essays on Greek Poetry and Philosophy by Seth Benardete, co-edited with Michael Davis (University of Chicago Press, 2000)

References

Further reading
 Speliotis, Evanthia. 2020. Nature, Law, and the Sacred: Essays in Honor of Ronna Burger. Mercer University Press.

External links
 Ronna Burger at Tulane University
 
 
 
 
 

21st-century American philosophers
Philosophy academics
The New School alumni
Tulane University faculty
Living people
1947 births
American scholars of ancient Greek philosophy
American women philosophers
Commentators on Aristotle
Commentators on Plato
Maimonides scholars
Jewish American academics
Jewish biblical scholars
Jewish philosophers
21st-century Jewish biblical scholars
21st-century American women
Philosophers from Ohio